Daniel McGowan may refer to:

Daniel A. McGowan, academic, and executive director of Deir Yassin Remembered
Daniel G. McGowan (born 1974), environmental activist jailed and fined in 2006 for his involvement with Earth Liberation Front actions
Danny McGowan (1924–1994), Irish footballer
Daniel McGowan (kickboxer) (born 1996), British Muay Thai fighter